Thando Mngomeni (born 11 February 1983 in Cape Town, Western Cape) is a South African football (soccer) midfielder.

Thando is a pure example of South Africa's unorthodox style of play.

He hails from Gugulethu on the Cape Flats and is the younger brother of former Orlando Pirates player and South African international Thabo Mngomeni.

Career
Mngomeni spent a season and a half in Sweden with Helsingborgs IF and made 29 appearances before returning to South Africa claiming he could not cope.

He returned to Santos after semi-retirement and impressed with some good performances during the 2007/08 season. He signed for Mamelodi Sundowns and moved to Bidvest Wits after a year and half.

He is currently playing in Cape Town for a 2nd division club, Magic FC.

International career
He has so far been capped five times.

Interest outside football 
Thando Mngomeni has acquired shares in an online soccer/football community called TheSoccerPages.Com to begin a career as a blogger and commentator.

He has taken on a role as co-host of a monthly live soccer/football talk show called Diski Nites in Cape Town.

He is also consulting with youth players helping them one-on-one with advice and skills training.

See also

 List of African association football families

References

External links
 
 
 Official personal blog

1983 births
Living people
South African soccer players
South Africa international soccer players
South African expatriate soccer players
South African Premier Division players
Allsvenskan players
Helsingborgs IF players
Bush Bucks F.C. players
SuperSport United F.C. players
Association football midfielders
Santos F.C. (South Africa) players
Bidvest Wits F.C. players
Mamelodi Sundowns F.C. players
Expatriate footballers in Sweden
Sportspeople from Cape Town